"Save Me" is a song by the American songwriter Aimee Mann. It appears on the Magnolia soundtrack, which was released on December 7, 1999.

Reception 
"Save Me" was nominated for an Academy Award for Best Original Song; Mann performed it at the 72nd Academy Awards. It lost to "You'll Be in My Heart", by Phil Collins, from the Disney movie Tarzan. By way of introduction to a live performance, Mann has referred to "Save Me" as "the song that lost an Oscar to Phil Collins and his cartoon monkey love song." "Save Me" was also nominated for a Grammy Award for Best Female Pop Vocal;

In 2022, Pitchfork named "Save Me" the 193rd best song of the 1990s. The critic Eric Torres wrote: "Subtly informed by a long period of disappointment, 'Save Me' is wry but surefooted ... The featherlight production and songwriting belie its inevitable punch: Here, Mann underscores the raw tenderness that comes with searching for help."

Mann later said the song "really gave a blood transfusion to my career. But it wasn't like I went from playing to five people to 5,000 people. It was just a real influx of energy."

Music video 
The music video, shot during the filming of Magnolia, was directed by the film's director, Paul Thomas Anderson, and uses many of the film's actors, including Julianne Moore, Philip Seymour Hoffman, Tom Cruise, William H. Macy, and John C. Reilly. The video inserts Mann into various scenes from the film as she performs the song. Unlike many such music videos, the "Save Me" video used no digital manipulation; the scenes were shot at the end of filming days with Mann and actors who were asked to stay in place.

References

1999 songs
Aimee Mann songs
Songs written for films
Songs written by Aimee Mann
Rock ballads
Music videos directed by Paul Thomas Anderson
Reprise Records singles